Charaxes nandina is a butterfly in the family Nymphalidae. It is found in Kenya, in the central highlands east of the Rift Valley.

Description
Ch. nandina Rothsch. : forewing above black, behind the middle of the hindmargin with an oblong blue spot in la, 2—4 blue spots in lb and then with 2 irregularly curved transverse rows of white or bluish white spots, the proximal row composed of four spots in cellules 2—5 and the distal of six in cellules 2—7; small yellowish marginal spots. Hindwing above between veins 2 and 7 with a posteriorly pointed, sharply defined blue median band, in the middle about 5 mm. in breadth, accompanied by a whitish spot in cellule 7; behind the middle runs an S-shaped curved row of 6 small blue spots and near the distal margin a curved row of 6 or 7 bluish dots; the marginal lunules themselves are yellowish; the tails well developed, about 5 mm. in length. The under 
surface agrees almost exactly with that of cithaeron. The female closely resembles that of xiphares, but differs in having a transverse row of 8 white spots behind the middle of the forewing above and in the smaller, ochre-yellow median spot of the hindwing. British East Africa in the Kikuyu district; rare.

Biology
The larvae feed on Drypetes gerrardii, Craibia brownii and Hippocratea africana.

The habitat is semi-dry and high forest.

Charaxes nandina is very closely related to Charaxes xiphares. It is sympatric with Charaxes cithaeron

Taxonomy
Charaxes tiridates group

The supposed clade members are:
Charaxes tiridates
Charaxes numenes similar to next
Charaxes bipunctatus similar to last
Charaxes violetta
Charaxes fuscus
Charaxes mixtus
Charaxes bubastis
Charaxes albimaculatus
Charaxes barnsi
Charaxes bohemani
Charaxes schoutedeni
Charaxes monteiri
Charaxes smaragdalis
Charaxes xiphares
Charaxes cithaeron
Charaxes nandina
Charaxes imperialis
Charaxes ameliae
Charaxes pythodoris
? Charaxes overlaeti
For a full list see Eric Vingerhoedt, 2013.

References

Victor Gurney Logan Van Someren, 1964 Revisional notes on African Charaxes (Lepidoptera: Nymphalidae). Part II. Bulletin of the British Museum (Natural History) (Entomology)181-235.

External links
Images of C. nandina Royal Museum for Central Africa (Albertine Rift Project)
Charaxes nandina images at Consortium for the Barcode of Life

Butterflies described in 1901
nandina
Endemic insects of Kenya
Butterflies of Africa